TBS (an abbreviation for Turner Broadcasting System) is an American pay television network owned by the Warner Bros. Discovery U.S. Networks division of Warner Bros. Discovery (WBD). It carries a variety of programming, with a focus on comedy, along with some sports events, including Major League Baseball, Stanley Cup playoffs, NCAA men's basketball tournament and the weekly professional wrestling show AEW Dynamite. As of September 2018, TBS was received by approximately 90.391 million households that subscribe to a pay television service throughout the United States.

TBS was originally established on December 17, 1976, as the national feed of Turner's Atlanta, Georgia, independent television station, WTCG. The decision to begin offering WTCG via satellite transmission to cable and satellite subscribers throughout the United States expanded the small station into the first nationally distributed "superstation." With the assignment of WTBS as the broadcast station's call letters in 1979, the national feed became known as SuperStation WTBS, and later SuperStation TBS, TBS Superstation, or simply TBS. The channel broadcast a variety of programming during this era, including films, syndicated series, and sports (including Atlanta Braves baseball, basketball games involving the Atlanta Hawks and other NBA teams, and professional wrestling including Georgia Championship Wrestling, Jim Crockett Promotions and later World Championship Wrestling).

WTBS maintained a nearly identical program schedule as the national feed, aside from FCC-mandated public affairs and educational programming that only aired on the local signal. By the early 2000s, TBS had begun to focus more intensively on comedic programming, including sitcoms and other series. On October 1, 2007, TBS was converted by Turner into a conventional basic cable network, at which time it began to be carried within the Atlanta market on area cable providers alongside its existing local carriage on satellite providers DirecTV and Dish Network. The former parent station in Atlanta was concurrently relaunched as WPCH-TV (branded as "Peachtree TV", which Turner sold to the Meredith Corporation in 2017, and later acquired by Gray Television in 2021) and reformatted as a traditional independent station with a separate schedule exclusively catering to the Atlanta market.

History

Early years
TBS originated as a terrestrial television station in Atlanta, Georgia that began operating on UHF channel 17 on September 1, 1967, under the WJRJ-TV call letters. That station—which its original parent originally filed to transmit UHF channel 46, before modifying it to assign channel 17 as its frequency in February 1966—was founded by Rice Broadcasting Inc. (owned by Atlanta entrepreneur Jack M. Rice, Jr., owner of locally based pay television firms Atlanta Telemeter Inc. and Home Theaters of Georgia Inc.). Under Rice, WJRJ—the first independent station to begin operation in the Atlanta market since WQXI-TV (channel 36, allocation now occupied by MyNetworkTV affiliate WATL) ceased operations on May 31, 1955—operated on a shoestring budget, general entertainment format with a schedule consisting of a few off-network reruns (such as Father Knows Best, The Danny Thomas Show, The Adventures of Ozzie and Harriet and The Rifleman) and older feature films as well as a 15-minute news program.

In July 1969, Rice Broadcasting reached an agreement to merge with the Turner Communications Corporation—an Atlanta-based group owned by entrepreneur Robert E. "Ted" Turner III, who ran his late father's billboard advertising business and had also expanded his interests to include radio stations in Chattanooga, Tennessee (WGOW), Charleston, South Carolina (WTMA-AM-FM, the FM station is now WSSX-FM), and Jacksonville, Florida (WMBR, now WQOP)—in an all-stock transaction. Under the sale terms, Rice would acquire Turner in an exchange of stock and adopt the Turner Communications name; however, Turner would acquire about 75% of the merged company and own 48.2% of its stock, receiving 1.2 million shares of Rice stock worth an estimated $3 million. The Federal Communications Commission (FCC) granted approval of the acquisition on December 10, 1969, giving Turner its first television property. Soon after Turner received approval of its purchase of WJRJ-TV in January 1970, Turner changed the station's call letters to WTCG (which officially stood for Turner Communications Group, although the station used "Watch This Channel Grow" as a promotional slogan). The sale was formally completed four months later on April 6, 1970, at which time Turner was assigned as licensee of WJRJ-TV.

The channel 17 transmitter was originally located at 1018 West Peachtree Street Northwest (it has since been relocated to the Atlanta suburb of North Druid Hills, Georgia), with the antenna located on the Turner Broadcasting tower. The building at this site was once home to the studios of CBS affiliate WAGA-TV (channel 5, now a Fox owned-and-operated station) and, later, channel 17, during its first three years as WJRJ-TV. By 1980, the station moved to new studio facilities a few blocks west at the former site of the Progressive Club, along with overflow offices on Williams Street, across Interstate 75/85, those facilities now house Adult Swim and Williams Street Productions. (It shared the ex-Progressive Club studios with CNN and Headline News until the latter two moved their operations into the CNN Center downtown in 1987). Early programming included movies from the 1930s and 1940s, sitcoms (such as Father Knows Best, Green Acres, Hazel, I Love Lucy, and The Lucy Show), and Japanese animated series (such as Astro Boy, Kimba the White Lion, Marine Boy, The Space Giants, Speed Racer, and Ultraman). The station also carried sports, such as Atlanta Braves baseball, Atlanta Hawks basketball, Atlanta Flames hockey, and Georgia Championship Wrestling.

WTCG also made very low bids to acquire the rights to syndicated programming and film packages, leaving the network-affiliated stations in the market—WAGA-TV, NBC affiliate WSB-TV (channel 2, now an ABC affiliate) and ABC affiliate WXIA-TV (channel 11, now an NBC affiliate)—to acquire the stronger shows. But, because of programming commitments that the affiliates had to their networks, those stations only kept the shows for a few years at a time and rarely renewed their contractual rights to continue airing them, after which WTCG bought the syndicated programs second-hand at much lower rates. By the mid-1970s, The Andy Griffith Show, The Flintstones, Leave It to Beaver, The Little Rascals, My Three Sons, Star Trek, The Three Stooges, and many others were added to the station's schedule.

WTCG gets beamed via satellite
By the time Turner acquired WTCG, most U.S. cities below the top 20 media markets lacked independent stations running general entertainment programs, and largely only had access to television stations affiliated with ABC, NBC, and CBS, along with a non-commercial educational station. Still, many places were far enough out of the reach of an independent station's signal that this was not an option. There were cable systems that carried three stations affiliated with each of the major commercial networks and three stations that were PBS member outlets (one station from within the home market and two stations from neighboring markets of each network).

WTCG started to reach far beyond the Atlanta television market in the early 1970s to serve such areas lacking an independent station, as many cable television systems in middle and southern Georgia and surrounding areas of the Southeastern United States—particularly Alabama, Tennessee and South Carolina—began picking up the UHF signal off-air and retransmitted the Atlanta studio/transmitter link feed to microwave relay towers (sometimes several times) back to their headends. (By June 1976, WTCG was carried by 95 cable systems in six Southeastern states, reaching an estimated 440,000 households).

Turner began formulating plans to take WTCG national upon hearing of the groundbreaking innovation that premium cable service Home Box Office (HBO) (which would eventually become a sister property to channel 17 as a result of Time Warner's 1996 acquisition of the Turner Broadcasting System) engaged in to retransmit its programming nationwide utilizing communications satellites beginning with its September 30, 1975, telecast of the "Thrilla in Manila" boxing match. In December 1975, Ted Turner unveiled plans to distribute his station over communications satellite, enabling WTCG to extend distribution of its programming to cable and C-band satellite subscribers throughout the United States, especially in markets lacking even a distant independent station. With a more cost-effective and expeditious distribution method in place than would be capable through setting up microwave and coaxial telephone relay systems across the entire country, Turner got his idea off the ground by founding Southern Satellite Systems (SSS)—a common carrier uplink provider based in Tulsa, Oklahoma—to serve as the station's satellite redistributor, and subsequently purchased an earth-to-satellite transmitting station to be set up outside of WTCG's Peachtree Street studios in Atlanta. In order to get around FCC rules in effect at the time that prohibited a common carrier from having involvement in program origination, Turner decided to sell SSS to former Western Union vice president of marketing Edward L. Taylor for $1 and sold the transmitting station to RCA American Communications. Upon the sale's consummation in March 1976, Turner reached an agreement with Taylor to have the firm uplink the WTCG signal to the Satcom 1 satellite.

Turner's plans to turn WTCG into a national cable service were made possible through various FCC deregulatory actions on signal importation during the 1970s, among them was a cable rules package passed in March 1972 that allowed cable systems in the 100 largest markets the right to carry imported signals (including the addition of two distant signals not already available in the market), restricted cable systems in smaller markets to carrying only three network stations and one independent station (except for undefinable markets that would not be limited in the number of carried imported signals), and instituted leapfrogging rules that required systems importing distant independent stations from the top-25 markets to choose from one or both of the two markets closest to the provider's city of license and any systems carrying the signal of a third independent being required to pick up a UHF or, if such a station is not available, VHF station located within a  radius. Further changes to signal importation regulations occurred with the August 1975 passage of a policy allowing unlimited importation of distant signals either following a local "must carry" station's final daily sign-off or at 1:00 a.m. (Eastern and Pacific Time) and 12:00 a.m. (in all other time zones), and the December 1975 repeal of the agency's 1972 "leapfrogging" rules (which restricted cable systems from selecting a distant signal from among stations in the top-25 media markets beyond those closest to the licensed system). Furthermore, the Congressional passage of the Copyright Act of 1976 on October 1 of that year provided compulsory licenses to cable systems and "passive" satellite carriers, allowing them to retransmit any broadcast television station throughout the country, regardless of prior consent, without incurring copyright liability; this legislation also granted the U.S. Copyright Office the ability to charge cable systems royalty fees to be compensated to the owners of a copyrighted program. The station would still be subjected to program duplication restrictions covered under the original 1972 incarnation of the Syndication Exclusivity Rules (or "SyndEx"), which—prior to its repeal in July 1980—allowed television stations to claim local exclusivity over syndicated programs and required cable systems to either black out or secure an agreement with the claimant station or a syndication distributor to continue carrying a claimed program through an out-of-market station.

At 1:00 p.m. Eastern Time on December 17, 1976, WTCG became America's first "superstation"—independent stations distributed to cable providers throughout their respective regions, or the entire country—when its signal began to be beamed via the Satcom 1 satellite to four cable systems in the Midwestern and Southeastern United States: Multi-Vue TV in Grand Island, Nebraska, Hampton Roads Cablevision in Newport News, Virginia, Troy Cablevision in Troy, Alabama, and Newton Cable TV in Newton, Kansas. At that moment, approximately 24,000 additional households began receiving the WTCG signal. The station's first national broadcast was the 1948 Dana Andrews–Cesar Romero film Deep Waters, which had been in progress for 30 minutes on channel 17 in Atlanta.

With this move, WTCG would become one of the first television stations, and only the second U.S. broadcaster—after HBO—to be transmitted via satellite, instead of the then-standard method of using microwave relay to distribute a programming feed. Turner's decision to turn his television station into a national programming service was an expensive gamble on his part, given that he spent about $6 million of the $14 million that the station made in annual gross revenue at the time on satellite transmission. SSS initially charged prospective cable systems 10¢ per subscriber to transmit the WTCG signal as a 24-hour channel and 2¢ per subscriber to carry it as a part-time, overnight-only service (with the intent of acting as a timeshare feed on a cable channel otherwise occupied by a local or out-of-market broadcast station during their normal sign-off period).

Instantly, WTCG went from being a small independent television station that regularly placed near the bottom of the ratings among Atlanta's television stations well into the 1970s and was available only in Georgia and neighboring states to a major coast-to-coast operation, pioneering the distribution of broadcast television stations via satellite transmission to pay television subscribers nationwide. Ted Turner's innovation set a precedent for today's basic cable television and signaled the start of the revolution of basic cable programming in the United States. Soon after, an increasing number of cable television providers throughout the United States sought to carry WTCG on their systems. Within three years of WTCG achieving national status, the signals of fellow independent stations WOR-TV (now MyNetworkTV owned-and-operated station WWOR-TV) in New York City and WGN-TV in Chicago were also uplinked to satellite for distribution as national superstations; eventually, other independents such as KTVT (now a CBS owned-and-operated station) in Dallas, KTVU (now a Fox owned-and-operated station) in San Francisco and KTLA (now a CW affiliate) in Los Angeles were uplinked to satellite as well, primarily being carried on a regional basis.

The expansion of WTCG into a superstation would serve as the linchpin for what would later be renamed the Turner Broadcasting System to eventually launch or acquire other cable-originated channels in subsequent years, including the Cable News Network (CNN) (launched on June 1, 1980), HLN (launched as CNN2 on January 1, 1982, and later known as CNN Headline News from 1983 to 2007), Turner Network Television (TNT) (launched on October 3, 1988), Cartoon Network (launched on October 1, 1992), Turner Classic Movies (TCM) (launched on April 14, 1994), and TruTV (folded into Turner, as Court TV, following the closure of parent Time Warner's acquisition of Liberty Media's 50% interest in the channel in May 2006).

Turner and station management treated WTCG as an "active" superstation, directly asserting national promotional responsibilities, investing in programming, and charging advertising rates at the national and local levels. This resulted in the station paying for syndicated programming at (albeit reasonably cheaper) rates comparable to other national networks, rather than merely receiving royalty payments from cable systems for programs to which it held the copyright as "passive" superstations—like WGN and WWOR, which opted to take a neutral position on their national distribution and left national promotional duties to the satellite carriers that retransmitted their signals—did. (Unlike WTCG, most other superstations had their signals redistributed without their owner's express permission under a provision in Section 111 of the Copyright Act of 1976, which allowed local cable systems to "retransmit copyrighted programming from any over-the-air stations across the country to their subscribers under a compulsory license").

WTCG initially was identified as "Channel 17" or "Super 17" both locally in Atlanta and on cable providers outside of that area; by 1979, the station identified primarily by its call letters locally and nationally. Over time, as WTCG was also beginning to gain traction in the Atlanta market, the station also began to gain traction nationally as more cable systems added the WTCG signal to their lineups; by 1978, WTCG was carried on cable providers in all 50 U.S. states, reaching over 2.3 million subscribers, a total that would substantially double each year into the next decade. Because it utilized a broadcast television station as the origination point for its programming, throughout its existence as a superstation, all programs on WTCG/WTBS—which transmitted exactly the same schedule nationally as that seen on the local Atlanta broadcast feed—were broadcast on an Eastern Time schedule (with programs shown at earlier or, for those viewing in the Atlantic Time Zone in far eastern Canada and the Maritimes, later times depending on the location), resulting in programs being shown simultaneously in all six continental U.S. and all five Canadian time zones as they did in the Atlanta area on channel 17. (Promos for WTCG/WTBS programs referenced airtimes for both the Eastern and Central Time Zones until 1987, and the Eastern and Pacific time zones thereafter until 1992 and occasionally beforehand for certain scheduled live sports and event telecasts).

Initial change to WTBS

In May 1979, Turner made a $25,000 donation to a group associated with the Massachusetts Institute of Technology (MIT) to fund the construction of a new transmitter, in exchange for acquiring the WTBS call letters that had been assigned to the university's Cambridge-based student radio station for use on the channel 17 license; Turner also agreed to donate an additional $25,000 to the group if the FCC agreed to assign the WTBS calls to Turner Communications. (MIT subsequently changed the radio station's calls to WMBR.) On August 27, 1979, the Atlanta parent station changed its call letters to WTBS (for "Turner Broadcasting System", the name its parent company adopted in accordance with the callsign change).

Concurrently, Turner began branding the station as "SuperStation WTBS"—the prefix word was re-rendered in mixed case in October 1980, with both "S"s capitalized—with occasional references within the logo to the channel 17 frequency in Atlanta. (Accordingly, many cable providers throughout the country even carried it on channel 17 during some part of its existence as a superstation). However, the national feed continued to occasionally use the same on-air branding as the Atlanta area signal (which was referred to on-air at the time as "WTBS Channel 17") until October 1980. By 1981, the Atlanta station would be branded as "SuperStation 17", on the national feed available outside of the Atlanta area, though, references to the station's over-the-air channel number were completely removed—outside of minor technical issues where local ads and promos aired erroneously on the national feed.

The on-air look of the station by this time was heavily reliant on then state-of-the-art Quantel Paintbox graphics, with slick animation created by a team of in-house graphic designers, led by creative services director John Christopher Burns. He and others would develop this look further in the years that followed, eventually forming the design firm Television by Design to provide services to other television stations around the country (including WXIA-TV, rival independent WGNX [channel 46, now CBS affiliate WANF] and PBS member station WPBA [channel 30, now WABE-TV] within the Atlanta market). Burns would leave TVbD, but continued to be employed by Turner Broadcasting for other projects, including the 1989 revamp of Headline News and the 1991 redesign of WTBS itself (handled by Burns' brother James). John Young, an Atlanta-area radio DJ at WZGC, became the voice of SuperStation WTBS during this time and would go on to provide promotional voiceover services for other local and national clients as a direct result of his work for the channel. Other voiceovers were handled by Turner employees, most notably music director Bill "Troll" Tullis, who generally voiced station IDs and other miscellaneous work with a distinctive monotone; he would become the voice heard during Headline News' half-hourly network IDs by the mid-1980s.

During the late 1970s and early 1980s, WTBS continued to acquire second-hand programming such as made-for-TV Popeye cartoons, The Brady Bunch, The Munsters, and other programs. The station acquired reruns of All in the Family and Sanford and Son in 1979, as well as Little House on the Prairie and CHiPs in 1981. Other older shows would eventually be removed from the schedule. WTCG also mixed more movie releases from the 1950s through the 1970s into its schedule. By July 1979, WTCG/WTBS was available to 1,000 cable systems throughout the United States, with a total of 4.8 million cable subscribers receiving the signal. In 1981, Turner decided to split the WTBS satellite feed from its terrestrial signal; under this structure, all of the shows seen on WTBS continued to air nationally over its superstation feed (in a move that preceded fellow superstations WGN-TV and WWOR-TV doing the same thing, though only after the FCC's re-implementation of the Syndication Exclusivity Rights rule in 1990). Although, separate national advertising or per inquiry ads replaced the local commercials intended for broadcast in the Atlanta area—which became exclusively carried by channel 17 locally—on the superstation feed.

The 1980s also saw WTBS begin to venture into original programming, in 1980, the station premiered Tush, a late night sketch comedy and variety series hosted and developed by comedian Bill Tush (who had hosted newsbriefs and, occasionally, movie presentations for WTBS, in addition to serving as a staff announcer), with Jan Hooks (who would later gain fame during her stint as a cast member on Saturday Night Live). Starcade, a game show that ran from 1982 to 1983 (with a further run in syndication via Turner Program Services until 1984), where people competed to win their very own arcade cabinet by playing various games. Other programming efforts included The Catlins (a Dynasty-style prime time soap opera which ran for two seasons from 1983 to 1985, and was the only Procter & Gamble serial to be produced for cable television), and sitcoms Down to Earth, Rocky Road, and Safe at Home (all three of which were produced by The Arthur Company, and formed a block of first-run comedy series aimed at a family audience). In addition, from 1986 through 1989, TBS also produced more than 70 original episodes of The New Leave It To Beaver, which it picked up after that series was canceled by The Disney Channel in 1985. (TBS's addition of The New Leave It To Beaver to its lineup also coincided with the original Leave it to Beaver airing in reruns on the channel, as Ted Turner felt that the former would make a good programming fit with the latter.)

On September 7, 1987, the "W" from the "WTBS" callsign was dropped from the superstation's on-air branding—changing its name to SuperStation TBS—in order to emphasize the channel's national programming prominence, with the WTBS Atlanta signal continuing to use the separate "SuperStation 17" branding; this coincided with a major promotional campaign centered around "Great American Television". By 1987, SuperStation WTBS was available to 41.6 million households with a cable or satellite subscription nationwide; this total jumped to 49 million cable homes by the summer of 1988.

On May 18, 1988, the FCC reinstated syndication exclusivity restrictions through the passage of a new version of the Syndication Exclusivity Rights Rule. This version granted cable systems and satellite carrier firms the ability to secure an agreement to air a claimed syndicated program with the claimant local rightsholder or a syndication distributor, effectively allowing for superstations to acquire national cable rights for syndicated programs (either directly or through their satellite carrier). In preparation for the new rules taking effect on January 1, 1990, Turner Broadcasting began to fill the WTBS schedule with additional programming—primarily, off-network syndicated comedy and drama series (such as The Jeffersons and Good Times) as well as acquired film packages (consisting of both theatrical features and made-for-television films) and original programs (such as Jacques Cousteau specials, and National Audubon Society and National Geographic programs)—for which it would hold exclusive cable rights in order to make the national feed "100% blackout-free." Combined with the utilization of indemnification provisions designed to protect against monetary damages if a superstation has "a reasonable basis for concluding that[...] programing deletion is not required," this ensured that the TBS national feed would be absolved from potential blackouts necessitated by any local syndication exclusivity claims and, therefore, prevent defections by cable affiliates that indicated it would remove any distant signals rather than shoulder the expense of blacking out or substituting non-compliant programs.

On September 28, 1989, the channel's name was changed to TBS SuperStation to reflect the strong national standing of the channel. Debuting concurrently with the name change was a promotional campaign utilizing the slogan "TBYes!", featuring various stars of programs seen on TBS—including, among others, Bob Denver and Alan Hale of Gilligan's Island (as their respective characters Gilligan and Captain Jonas Grumby aka "The Skipper"), Al Lewis of The Munsters (as his character Grandpa), Buddy Ebsen of The Beverly Hillbillies (as his character J.D. "Jed" Clampett) and Jimmie Walker of Good Times (appearing as himself)—with graphical elements of fireworks and a large rotating glass pane, which could display the TBS logo, change to or from a slogan (depending on the promotional spot) to the logo, or be used to show the airtime of programs mentioned in a specific promotion or summarize the next three programs set to air. Title sequences for movies and special presentations—which were accompanied by music incorporating variants of the "TBYes" promotional theme's signature—showed people in a main street setting flocking to a TBS-branded theater, which transitions to a panning shot stopping at a couch in the front row of the theater's seating area where either a family or a couple (depending on the daypart presentation, as identified at the end of the sequence) sit down in time for the start of the film.

On September 10, 1990, the word "Superstation" was removed from the cable channel's on-air branding and promotions, rebranding it as simply "TBS", which had been used verbally in on-air promotions since the beginning of that year. By 1992, TBS was available in 58 million households with cable and satellite television service, accounting for more than half of all homes in the United States, Puerto Rico and the U.S. Virgin Islands—and carried by 14,815 cable systems throughout the country.

Metro-Goldwyn-Mayer/United Artists library
During the 1980s, WTBS focused heavily on movies—running two films during the day, and a largely movie-exclusive schedule during the nighttime hours after 8:00 p.m. Eastern Time (with exceptions made for scheduled sporting events, specials, original programs and, in the case of Sunday nights, off-network syndicated series and paid programming). At other times, mainly during the daytime hours each weekday and on weekend mornings, WTBS continued to run mostly classic sitcoms and vintage cartoons. In 1986, when Ted Turner purchased Metro-Goldwyn-Mayer/United Artists (which he would sell back to previous owner Kirk Kerkorian that October due to debt incurred by the Turner Broadcasting System from its purchase of the film studio), WTBS gained the rights to the entire MGM/UA film library (including certain acquisitions by MGM). It gave WTBS the rights to air many theatrical cartoon shorts such as Tom & Jerry, as well as shows like Gilligan's Island and CHiPs.

Along with Tom & Jerry, WTBS began to run The Little Rascals, Looney Tunes/Merrie Melodies cartoons released prior to August 1948, theatrical Popeye cartoon shorts, and Three Stooges shorts under the banner The TBS Tom & Jerry Funhouse running for either one hour or 90 minutes during the morning hours and for an hour (later, half-hour) in the afternoon from 1986 to 1995. In the late 1980s, WTBS decreased the number of movies broadcast during the day slightly and began to add sitcoms from the 1970s (such as Happy Days, The Jeffersons, Good Times, and One Day at a Time) to the evening lineup; Little House on the Prairie aired during the late mornings continuously from 1986 to 2003.

Other programming
Music videos also aired during its late night lineup on weekends from June 1983 to May 1992 as part of the program Night Tracks, which aired in the form of two three-hour-long blocks (later reduced to two two-hour blocks in August 1989, and then to two 90-minute blocks in the spring of 1990), barring pre-emptions from sporting events that ran over their scheduled end-time. (The success of Night Tracks served as the basis for Turner to develop Cable Music Channel, an attempt at a competitor to MTV that operated for five weeks from October 26 to November 30, 1984, and was one of the shortest-lived channels in American cable television history.) Beginning in 1991, a handful of shows (mostly movies) that were shown nationally were pre-empted in the Atlanta market in order to broadcast FCC-mandated news, public affairs, and children's programming; this continued until the split of the TBS national feed from the Atlanta station in October 2007.

In addition to offering conventional television programming over the main video-audio feed viewable to all multichannel television subscribers receiving the channel, Southern Satellite Systems transmitted two teletext services over the TBS superstation feed's vertical blanking interval (VBI) that required a special decoder to receive the provided information services over the feed. SSS began transmitting the United Press International (UPI) teletext news service over the national feed's VBI signal in 1979. 1981 saw the VBI signal begin to carry the Keyfax service out of Chicago. In 1985, SSS repurposed the VBI signal to transmit the Electra teletext service, Electra was transmitted over the VBI until the service was shut down in 1993 due to a lack of funding and interest. (The other partners in the venture, Zenith Electronics and Taft Broadcasting [formerly known as Taft Television & Radio Company during its earlier existence as both an electronics manufacturer and broadcaster] had respectively stopped manufacturing TV sets with teletext capability and had undergone several corporate buyouts).

In the early 1990s, shows such as The Flintstones, The Brady Bunch, Scooby-Doo, The Jetsons, Looney Tunes/Merrie Melodies shorts, Gilligan's Island, and others remained on the schedule as other older shows such as The Three Stooges and Little Rascals shorts and Leave it to Beaver were dropped from the channel to make way for more sitcoms from the 1980s such as Three's Company, Who's the Boss?, Growing Pains, The Cosby Show, Family Ties, and Saved by the Bell. Original animated programs such as Captain Planet and the Planeteers, 2 Stupid Dogs, and SWAT Kats: The Radical Squadron were also added as part of the "Sunday Morning In Front of the TV" block. Following Turner's acquisition by Time Warner, among the programming changes instituted after the merger was the addition of Looney Tunes/Merrie Melodies cartoons that were released after August 1, 1948, which began airing on TBS as well as sister channel Cartoon Network in January 1997.

Time Warner purchase; shift towards comedy

On September 22, 1995, Time Warner—a New York City-based media company formed in 1990 through the merger of Time Inc. and Warner Bros. corporate parent Warner Communications—reached an agreement to acquire the Turner Broadcasting System (TBS) and its associated properties (including TBS, TNT, Cartoon Network, CNN and CNN Headline News as well as Turner Entertainment) for $7.5 billion; the deal would also expand Time Warner's pay television holdings, as it had owned HBO and sister premium service Cinemax as well as cable television provider Time Warner Cable since the Time-Warner Communications merger six years prior. (Time Warner and predecessor Warner Communications had owned an 18% interest in Turner Broadcasting since 1987, as part of a cable television industry-backed bailout of the company amid severe financial issues.) Under the terms, Turner would acquire an approximate 10% interest in Time Warner as well as oversee its subscription network group—comprising the Turner and Home Box Office units and its minority interests in Comedy Central and E!—and hold a position on the company's board of directors (which he retained until he stepped down from the company in February 2006) upon the merger's closure. The merger received regulatory approval on September 12, 1996; the Turner–Time Warner deal was finalized one month later on October 10, forming what at the time was the largest media company in the world. In September 1996, TBS replaced religious programs and infomercials that had aired on Sunday mornings and late nights with animated series and feature films, respectively, in those time slots.

On December 17, 1996, when TBS celebrated its 20th anniversary as a national service, the channel reincorporated the "Superstation" moniker into its name, rebranding as "TBS Superstation" (this time with the second "s" rendered in lower case). (Promotions for the channel's programming beginning at this time until 2004 often verbally referred to the national feed only as "the Superstation", a moniker that had previously been used in certain on-air promotions on an alternating basis or in conjunction with the WTBS/TBS name from its national launch as a superstation in December 1976 until December 1989). During this time, the network's look included a spiral/swirl shape (frequently positioned behind the TBS logo, presumably to depict the superstation's broadcast signal radiating outwards), as well as "Super"-branded blocks (such as Super Prime for prime time movie presentations, "Super TV" for weekday daytime films and series, and Super Weekend for film telecasts on Saturdays and Sundays).

On December 17, 1997, Time Warner purchased Southern Satellite Systems from Liberty Media for $213 million in cash, as part of a purchase option that Time Warner chose to exercise on September 16. Time Warner held out on an option to acquire SSS through a common stock buyout and instead chose a cash payment citing the "strong overall financial performance of its businesses and its belief that its stock remains undervalued" in spite of price appreciation having been appreciated. The purchase gave Time Warner control over uplink responsibilities for TBS.

On January 1, 1998, the TBS national feed—although continuing to operate as a superstation by technicality—began operating under the conventions of a basic cable channel. At that time, the Turner Broadcasting System began to collect subscriber fees (averaging 26¢ per subscriber per month) directly from cable and satellite providers that had previously paid a 30¢-per-month licensing fee to Southern Satellite Systems for access to the TBS signal and a 10¢-per-month copyright fee to a federal copyright tribunal (which, in turn, paid the fee directly to program distributors) for rights to carry its programming. The additional revenue was intended to be used for programming acquisitions, particularly rights to first-run theatrical films. In exchange, TBS began to lease two minutes of advertising time per hour to multichannel subscription television providers to allow them to locally insert commercials catering to viewers in the provider's service area; as a result, the channel began to broadcast fewer Atlanta Braves regular season games to a national audience, under amended contractual agreements between Turner and Major League Baseball in conjunction with the league's cable-originated rightsholders, ESPN and Fox Sports Net/Liberty Sports, to allow TBS to continue carrying Braves telecasts nationwide.

In 1998, TBS Superstation—which continued to run a mix of movies, sitcoms and drama series—removed all of its remaining cartoon shorts and animated series (which at the time were running under the Disaster Area banner), migrating those shows exclusively to Cartoon Network. (Many of these series also later became the core of a new channel devoted to classic cartoons, Boomerang, which launched in April 2000.) In 1999, TBS also refocused its original program offerings, removing documentaries and National Geographic specials—which were shifted over to CNN—in favor of carrying original made-for-TV movies and weekly series such as the reality show Ripley's Believe It or Not! and the short-lived comedy series The Chimp Channel (a series based on the "Monkey-ed Movies" series of interstitial shorts parodying recent and classic theatrical movies with chimpanzees, voiced by human actors, in the roles). By 2001, several sitcoms from the 1980s and 1990s such as Full House, Family Matters, The Cosby Show, The Fresh Prince of Bel-Air, Friends, Seinfeld, and Home Improvement became part of the channel's schedule; many of these shows aired as part of the "Non-Stop Comedy Block", a late-afternoon block of mostly adult-targeted comedy series that debuted in January 2002.

In September 2003, TBS dropped Little House on the Prairie and other dramatic programming as a part of a format shift toward comedic programs, such as sitcom reruns, original reality television series, and theatrically released comedy films. As part of this refocusing, the "Superstation" sub-brand was once again dropped in February 2004, with the channel reverting to being branded as simply TBS. Subsequently, on June 4, 2004, to signify the channel's new comedy programming focus, TBS introduced a new logo (designed by Publicis New York) that rendered the channel's name in lowercase and incorporated a semicircle made to resemble a mouth open as if it were laughing and adopted the slogan "veryfunny." The semicircle element took on a motif with half a baseball or basketball rendered within it for Turner Sports programming. The refocusing was intended to position its programming as a direct contrast to sister channel TNT, which had initially focused mainly around older movies and sports but moved toward and now focuses primarily on drama series and films.

Split from the Atlanta signal
In late June 2007, the Turner Broadcasting System announced that WTBS would change its callsign to WPCH-TV, and would be rebranded as "Peachtree TV." The rebranded channel 17 would offer sitcoms and movies geared specifically toward the station's Atlanta audience, and would also broadcast 45 Braves baseball games starting with the team's 2008 season. The change occurred on October 1, 2007, with the national feed becoming a separate cable/satellite channel that retained the TBS name. In addition, the channel 17 changeover allowed Atlanta-area cable and IPTV subscribers—including those of Comcast and Charter Communications—that previously were only able to receive WTBS's local Atlanta signal to begin receiving the national TBS feed for the first time since the early 1980s. (Despite the separation of TBS and its former Atlanta parent station, some local television listings publications have continued to refer to the channel as an Atlanta station in their channel charts and/or by that station's former WTBS call letters in said charts and as an identifier in listings grids). Following the change, Canadian subscription television providers were legally required to continue carrying the local Peachtree TV signal, instead of switching to the national TBS feed. Beginning with the 2008 season, TBS began airing Major League Baseball postseason games, with regular season baseball coverage expanding to include games from other MLB teams.

In November 2009, TBS debuted its first late-night talk show, Lopez Tonight, hosted by comedian George Lopez. One year later, the channel expanded its late-night offerings with the November 8, 2010, debut of Conan, after TBS struck a deal to give Conan O'Brien a show on the channel on the heels of his controversial exit as host of NBC's The Tonight Show. Lopez Tonight ended its run on August 12, 2011, after it was cancelled due to a steep decline in ratings. In 2011, TBS also obtained a portion of the television rights to the NCAA Men's Division I Basketball Championship—which it shares with Turner-owned sister channels TNT and TruTV, along with the tournament's longtime over-the-air broadcaster, CBS.

During the first quarter of 2012, TBS's viewership in the 18-49 adult demographic beat all other advertiser-supported channels, in spite of the fact that TBS did not air any original programs in prime time during that period nor had it aired a show among the 50 highest-rated cable programs. The channel's third late-night talk show, The Pete Holmes Show, debuted on October 28, 2013, hosted by comedian Pete Holmes (like Lopez Tonight, it could not capitalize on Conan as its lead-in and was cancelled in May 2014).

On May 14, 2015, at the Turner Upfront presentation, president Kevin Reilly announced a major shift within the next few years for TBS and TNT. The expanded development slate would see TBS feature more original live-action comedies, original animated series, more late-night talk shows, and lots more of "big unscripted ideas with attitude". One of the first success stories out of this effort was the satirical news series Full Frontal with Samantha Bee, hosted by the former correspondent for Comedy Central's The Daily Show (which served as a basis for Full Frontals format).

A new logo—which was previously revealed on social media 1½ months prior on September 16—made its official debut on the evening of October 31, 2015. Bumpers  feature the logo being formed into different shapes, objects, structures and surroundings (such as a gravestone, a flag on a submarine sandwich, and a monster eating the former logo, etc.).

AT&T ownership
On October 22, 2016, AT&T announced an offer to acquire Time Warner for $108.7 billion, including debt it would assume from the latter, the merger would bring Time Warner's various media properties, including TBS, under the same corporate umbrella as AT&T's telecommunications holdings, including satellite provider DirecTV. Time Warner shareholders approved the merger on February 15, 2017; however, on February 28, 2017, FCC Chairman Ajit Pai announced that his agency will not review the deal, leaving the review to the U.S. Department of Justice. The merger also resulted in the full separation of TBS from former parent station WPCH (this time by ownership) in an effort to expedite the AT&T–Time Warner merger, when on February 20, 2017, the Meredith Corporation—which had assumed operational responsibilities for WPCH from Turner/Time Warner in January 2011 to form a virtual duopoly with CBS affiliate WGCL-TV (channel 46)—announced that it would acquire WPCH-TV's license assets from Turner for $70 million. (The sale of WPCH to Meredith received FCC approval on April 17, 2017, and was finalized four days later on April 21, 2017).

On November 20, 2017, the Justice Department filed a lawsuit against AT&T and Time Warner in an attempt to block the merger, citing antitrust concerns surrounding the transaction. The proposed merger—which had already been approved by the European Commission and Mexican, Chilean and Brazilian regulatory authorities—was affirmed by court ruling on June 12, 2018, after District of Columbia U.S. District Court Judge Richard J. Leon ruled in favor of AT&T, dismissing the DOJ's antitrust claims in the lawsuit. The merger closed two days later on June 14, with the company becoming a wholly owned subsidiary of AT&T under the renamed parent company WarnerMedia. The U.S. Court of Appeals in Washington unanimously upheld the lower court's ruling in favor of AT&T on February 26, 2019.

On March 4, 2019, AT&T announced a major reorganization of its broadcasting assets, in which WarnerMedia's television properties would be divided among three divisions within the WarnerMedia umbrella. TBS, along with TNT, truTV and HBO would be reassigned to WarnerMedia Entertainment. The move would effectively dissolve the Turner Broadcasting System umbrella as part of a wind-down of the Turner name from the reorganized parent company's corporate structure. AT&T did not specify any timetable for the changes to take effect, although WarnerMedia had begun to remove all Turner references in corporate communications and press releases, referring to that unit's networks as "divisions of WarnerMedia".

Warner Bros. Discovery era 
On April 8, 2022, WarnerMedia was divested by AT&T and merged with Discovery Inc. to form Warner Bros. Discovery. On April 26, it was reported that WBD had suspended original scripted series development at TBS and TNT in order to evaluate the channels' strategies moving forward. At this point, TBS only had three original scripted series still airing first-run episodes, American Dad!, Chad (which itself would be dropped by WBD before its' already-filmed second season made it to air; it would later be picked up by streaming service The Roku Channel), and Miracle Workers. On May 11, Brett Weitz was removed as general manager for TBS, TNT, and TruTV; the channels are now overseen by Kathleen Finch as head of U.S. Networks.

Programming

TBS currently airs a mix of original sitcoms and reruns of sitcoms that were originally broadcast on the major broadcast networks. Original programs currently seen on TBS are American Dad! (which moved to TBS in 2014, after being canceled by Fox) and Miracle Workers.

The channel's daytime schedule is heavily dominated by reruns of current and former network comedies, with these shows also airing in the evening and sporadically during the overnight hours. As of August 2021, these programs consist of Bob's Burgers, Friends, Family Matters, George Lopez, The Big Bang Theory, and 2 Broke Girls. Most reruns shown on TBS are broadcast in a compressed format, with content sped up to accommodate additional time slots for advertising sales.

Turner Time
On June 29, 1981, TBS (as SuperStation WTBS) began to use a specialized program scheduling format known informally as "Turner Time." While program offerings on other broadcast and cable channels generally began at the top and bottom (:00 and :30 minutes) of each hour, TBS decided to begin airing programs—mainly original and off-network series, certain movies that followed blocks of series or maintained end times that did not fall within the half-hour, and sporting events—five minutes later, at :05 and :35 minutes past the hour.

Programs seen on TBS were listed under their own time entry in TV Guide (which, upon its inclusion—starting as early as 1980—in the magazine's listings section in all editions outside the Atlanta market, was designated under the alphanumeric "17A" identifier, before switching to the "TBS" identifier by 1987), during the period in which the magazine published log listings, as a result of this scheduling, thus enabling the program listings to catch potential viewers' eyes more readily. (Newspaper-published television listings magazines varied in how they listed TBS programs scheduled under the "Turner Time" structure, with some that listed programs in a time-prioritized "log" format initially continuing to lump the channel's shows with other programs with top- and bottom-of-the-hour start times for some period of time afterward.) The use of "Turner Time" also encouraged channel surfers who could not find anything interesting to watch at the top of the hour to still be able to watch a program on TBS without missing the first few minutes. Most importantly, since shows ended five minutes later than normal, from a strategic standpoint the off-time scheduling usually encouraged viewers to continue watching TBS rather than turning to another channel to watch a program that would already be airing in progress. (By 1991, the three major American broadcast networks also adopted the :05/:35 scheduling in a much more limited form for their late night programming schedules, mainly to allow their affiliates to sell additional ad inventory within their local late newscast slots; this practice continues to the present day.)

TBS reduced its use of the "Turner Time" scheduling in 1997 and switched entirely to conventional start times at the top and bottom of the hour by 2000, by this point, log listings were being phased out in favor of a grid-based layout (TV Guide would eliminate logs completely in 2005), eliminating one of Turner Time's strategic advantages. However, the channel continues to use unconventional start times for its movie presentations—which vary in their running times depending on the film's length with commercials added to pad the timeslot (for example, a movie that starts at 8:00 p.m. Eastern Time and has an allotted airtime exceeding 125 minutes may cause subsequent programming to start within the half-hour, such as at :15 and :45 after the hour). This often causes major disruptions in the start times of programming, and in some circumstances, conventional "top-and-bottom" start times would not be restored until early the next morning. While this is not exactly related to the "Turner Time" format, it may strategically serve the same purposes due to the off-time scheduling. The "Turner Time" format is similar to the scheduling applied by most premium channels and certain other movie-oriented services (which often schedule the start of programs in variable five-minute increments); other broadcast and subscription television channels have utilized similar off-time scheduling formats (such as Telemundo—which utilizes a "Turner Time"-style scheduling for programs during the first two hours of prime time—and Paramount Global-owned channels such as Nick at Nite, MTV and TV Land).

News programming
One type of programming that TBS does not produce presently is news. Nevertheless, TBS—during its existence as a superstation—produced a 20-minute-long satirical newscast, 17 Update Early in the Morning, from 1976 to 1979; hosted by Bill Tush and Tina Seldin, the program was taped at the end of the workday and aired between movies around 3:00 a.m. or 4:00 a.m. Eastern Time. Its format was similar to the Saturday Night Live news satire segment Weekend Update and was, to a certain extent, a forerunner to The Daily Show. The timeslot and the satirical content of the program were a reaction to FCC rules in effect at the time that required stations to carry some news and information content—although TBS had to broadcast news, the Federal Communications Commission could not dictate when it aired or demand that it have a serious tone. 17 Update Early in the Morning was cancelled months before Ted Turner began his serious television news venture, CNN, amid a Congressional investigation concerning whether he was fulfilling FCC public service requirements. Standard, more serious news updates with the 17 Update anchors—at first simply known as WTCG (News) Update, and later under the title NewsWatch—also ran during the day in-between programs. Upon its launch in January 1982, CNN2 (later Headline News, now HLN) assumed production responsibilities for the TBS NewsWatch segments, which began to be presented by that network's anchors and were split into several topic-specific segments (under the titles BusinessWatch for financial news, SportsWatch for sports news and FashionWatch for news on current and emerging fashion trends).

On July 21, 1980, CNN began producing an hour-long weeknight news program for WTBS, the TBS Evening News, which usually ran at 10:00 p.m. Eastern Time (varying depending on the length of the movie or sports presentation that preceded it). Owing to WTBS's national superstation status, rather than focusing on local news as prime time newscasts that aired on other independent stations had been doing (including those distributed as regional or national superstations), the program—which was originally anchored by David Jensen (who previously served as a host for BBC Radio 1, where he would rejoin less than a year after the program launched), Kevin Christopher and meteorologist Dallas Raines—focused on national and international news headlines as well as national weather forecasts and sports headlines. The TBS Evening News was discontinued after four years as a result of low ratings due to the frequent programming delays, with the program ending after the June 29, 1984, broadcast; the program was relaunched on CNN as the CNN Evening News on July 2, 1984. In addition, on July 31, 1980, WTBS also carried a 24-hour simulcast of CNN in place of its regular programming schedule; the simulcast was intended to help encourage subscriber demand to force cable and C-band satellite providers to begin carrying the news channel.

When the channel launched on January 1, 1982, WTBS also carried simulcasts of CNN's sister channel CNN2. The channel's launch was simulcast nationwide on WTBS as well as CNN starting at 11:45 p.m. on December 31, 1981, as a preview for cable and C-band providers throughout the U.S. that had not yet reached agreements to carry CNN2. Thereafter, initially to encourage viewers to ask for the network full-time, the station also ran a half-hour simulcast of CNN2/Headline News each morning at 6:00 a.m. in the Atlanta market and at 5:30 a.m. Eastern Time in the rest of the country. Abbreviated editions of Headline News would also occasionally be run as filler between daytime movie presentations and before the start of live sports telecasts. The Headline News simulcasts as well as the TBS NewsWatch segments were eventually phased out locally and nationally in 1996 following the relaxation of the FCC's public affairs programming requirements. (As WPCH-TV, the Atlanta station ran an hour-long simulcast block of HLN's Morning Express daily at 6:00 a.m. until the 2017 sale to Meredith, when it was replaced by a simulcast of WGCL's morning newscast.)

On September 11, 2001, TBS (along with sister channels TNT, Court TV, Headline News and the now-defunct CNNfn and CNN/SI) carried CNN's coverage of the terrorist attacks on the World Trade Center and The Pentagon. During sports blackouts in some areas (particularly in markets where a channel such as a local broadcast station or regional sports network has the regional or local broadcast rights to a particular sporting event that is scheduled to air elsewhere around the country on TBS), TBS carries rolling news coverage from HLN in its place.

Movies
Feature films have been a mainstay of TBS since its inception as a superstation, although the number of films featured on the channel's weekly schedule—which prior to that point, encompassed one to two films during the daytime and up to five at night on weekdays, and between eight and twelve features per day each weekend—has substantially declined since its 2007 conversion into a cable-exclusive channel.

In the present day, most of the films seen on TBS are of the comedy genre; however, some drama and action films continue to air on the channel periodically; movies on the channel generally air during the overnight hours on a daily basis and during much of the day on weekends (except from between 5:00 a.m. to 11:00 a.m. and 3:00 p.m. to 11:00 p.m. Eastern Time on Saturdays and 5:00 a.m. to 10:00 a.m. Eastern Time on Sunday mornings—with the start time subject to variation—due to sitcom blocks that typically air in those timeslots); this is in stark contrast to its existence as a superstation, when movies also filled late morning, early afternoon and prime time slots on weekdays. TBS broadcasts movies from sister companies Warner Bros. Pictures and New Line Cinema, along with films produced by Walt Disney Studios Motion Pictures, Sony Pictures Entertainment, Lionsgate, Metro-Goldwyn-Mayer, Universal Pictures, and Paramount Pictures.

Between the late 1990s and the early 2010s, TBS had frequently aired its prime time movies interspersed with other content and commentary (for example, Dinner and a Movie included cooking segments, while Movie and a Makeover featured fashion content); these wraparound segments later moved to weekend afternoon film presentations, before being dropped entirely by 2011. Since December 2004, TBS has broadcast a 24-hour marathon of A Christmas Story from Christmas Eve evening to Christmas Day evening; sister channel TNT has also run annual marathons of the 1983 film (airing concurrently with the TBS marathon event, but usually delayed by one hour) since 2014. Since November 2004, TBS has also run special prime time airings of The Wizard Of Oz in multiple showings around Thanksgiving each year. Once each weekend, TBS airs a movie in prime time with limited commercial interruption, branded in promo advertisements under the title "More Movies, Less Commercials" (sister channel TNT also runs a prime time movie each weekend, that is telecast with limited commercial interruption).

Sports programming

Baseball

Coverage of the Atlanta Braves Major League Baseball team—which was formerly owned by Ted Turner from 1976 until the 1996 acquisition of Turner Broadcasting by Time Warner—was perhaps TBS's signature program, mainly due to its viewer popularity in Georgia and neighboring states. Turner acquired the local television rights to the Braves for WTCG in July 1972, effective with the team's 1973 season, assuming the contract from then-NBC affiliate WSB-TV, which had carried the franchise's games since the Braves relocated from Milwaukee in 1966. Turner's contractual agreement with the team reversed the standard of MLB franchises designating originating stations, arranging their own regional carrier networks and handling advertising sales for their game telecasts. It was also particularly striking given that WTCG had experienced major profit losses ever since Ted Turner assumed ownership of the station from Rice Broadcasting in 1970; WTCG had only then started to break even in revenue and was just beginning to become more competitive with the Atlanta market's other television stations in terms of viewership.

Channel 17's Braves telecasts began airing nationally at the start of the 1977 season, after Turner and Southern Satellite Systems uplinked the station's signal via satellite. As WTCG reached a significant cable penetration rate throughout the Southern U.S. during 1978 and 1979, Turner ceased syndicating the team's game broadcasts and relegated those telecasts to the WTCG/WTBS cable feed, making the Braves the first team that did not provide live game coverage to broadcast stations outside of those within the team's home market. Turner once famously tried to get Andy Messersmith to use his #17 jersey to promote Superstation WTBS in its early years (the back of the jersey read, "CHANNEL 17"). The MLB organization immediately stopped Turner from proceeding with this plan due to league regulations barring team jerseys from incorporating advertising other than that of the jersey's manufacturer.

WTBS's broadcasts of Braves games helped expand the team's fanbase well outside of the Southern United States and earned them national prominence as "America's Team", even as the franchise's performance ranged from amiable to poor for much of the late 1970s and the 1980s. Some sportswriters even posited how such an awful team could have such broad availability via cable television, as with a 1990 Los Angeles Times column in which sportswriter Mike Downey jocularly lamented that TBS was short for "These Braves Stink." (During the aforementioned period, the team's only postseason appearance was in 1982 and only three seasons, 1980, 1982, and 1983, had the Braves achieve a scoring average above .500.)

At the 2006 MLB All-Star Game, it was announced that TBS would begin carrying a television package that includes all major league teams beginning with the 2007 season. TBS began carrying all Division Series games and one of the two League Championship Series (assuming the rights from Fox and ESPN) as well as the announcements of the All-Star teams and any possible games to determine division winners and wild card teams (those were also carried previously on ESPN). In 2008, TBS began airing MLB regular season Sunday games, with the provision that no team may appear on the telecasts more than 13 times during the season.

During the 2007 transitional year, TBS aired 70 regular-season Braves games. In 2008, the number of Braves telecasts was reduced to only 45 games, with TBS's former Atlanta feed, WPCH-TV solely carrying the telecasts; Turner syndicated the package to other television stations and local origination cable channels for broadcast in the remainder of the Braves' designated market area. The final Braves game to be broadcast on TBS aired on September 30, 2007, with the first divisional playoff game airing the following day on October 1, 2007 (when the TBS/WPCH split occurred).

On October 18, 2008, a technical problem at the channel's master control facility in Atlanta prevented TBS from showing the first inning of Game 6 of the American League Championship Series between the Boston Red Sox and Tampa Bay Rays; the channel aired a rerun episode of The Steve Harvey Show instead.

National Basketball Association

In October 1972, WTCG obtained the broadcast rights to broadcast NBA games involving the Atlanta Hawks (which was also owned by Ted Turner at the time) under a ten-year agreement. WTCG/WTBS and its superstation feed aired an average of 55 Hawks regular season games per season. TBS aired the games nationwide until the telecasts became subjected to NBA blackout restrictions within  of the home team's arena, resulting in many Hawks away games televised by the TBS national feed being unavailable to cable providers within the designated market area of the opposing team. (This restriction was dropped when TNT gained the right to be the exclusive broadcaster of any game that it chose to carry, although it was still subjected to league restrictions first imposed in 1982 that limited the number of games that could air per season on national and regional superstations.)

In the spring of 1984, WTBS reached an agreement with the NBA to broadcast games from league teams other than the Hawks beginning with the 1984–85 season; under the deal, WTBS/TBS maintained a package of approximately 55 regular season NBA games annually, with games airing on Tuesday and Friday nights. From 1985 until 1989, WTBS/TBS also televised anywhere from 12 to 20 early round conference playoff games beginning with the 1985 NBA Playoffs as well as the NBA draft. Under a joint broadcast contract signed between Turner Broadcasting and the NBA in the summer of 1987, the rights to NBA telecasts began to be split between TBS and upstart sister network TNT beginning with the league's 1988-89 season, with TNT assuming rights to the NBA Draft and most NBA regular season and playoff games and TBS's NBA telecasts being relegated to a single game or a double-headers one night per week. In 2001, Turner Sports signed a new television contract with the NBA, in which TNT would become Turner Broadcasting's exclusive rightsholder of NBA telecasts beginning with the 2002–03 season. (ESPN assumed TBS's portion of the league's pay television contract, though TBS maintained the right to air NBA on TNT games which have had overflow feeds.)

Professional wrestling

Professional wrestling aired on WTCG/WTBS from 1971 to 2001 under several different wrestling promotions. In 1971, the station served as the flagship outlet for the Jim Barnett-owned Georgia Championship Wrestling (GCW), acquiring the local rights to the program from WQXI-TV (now WXIA); the program concurrently began to be recorded in a soundstage at the channel 17's now-former West Peachtree Street studios in Midtown Atlanta. When WTBS became a national superstation in 1976, Georgia Championship Wrestling became the first National Wrestling Alliance (NWA) promotion to maintain a nationally televised broadcast, a move which made many of the NWA's regional promoters unhappy; however, Barnett allayed any issues citing that he was only using Georgia-based wrestlers.

In July 1984, GCW and the promotion's television timeslot rights were acquired by the Vince McMahon-owned World Wrestling Federation (WWF; now the WWE). The replacement show, WWF World Championship Wrestling (later retitled WWF Georgia Championship Wrestling in March 1985), mainly served as a recap of matches that had previously aired on the WWF's main programms, which angered Ted Turner, who hoped that the WWF would hold first-run matches originating from the WTBS studios. The WWF iteration of the show received much lower viewership than its predecessor; this led McMahon to sell the promotion's Saturday night time slot to Jim Crockett Promotions (owned by Charlotte-based wrestling promoter Jim Crockett, Jr.), who assumed production responsibilities for the wrestling program and utilized the same set. (Crockett's program relocated to a new arena soundstage at the CNN Center in 1988.)

In 1985, Turner acquired the television rights to Mid-South Wrestling (owned by Shreveport-based promoter Bill Watts) as a WWF alternative program. Although Mid-South quickly became the highest-rated program on WTBS, Watts lost out on acquiring the two-hour Saturday timeslot occupied by the WWF, when Barnett helped broker a deal that allowed Crockett to buy the slot from McMahon and become the superstation's exclusive wrestling promotion. Through the early 1990s, the wrestling programs and Braves baseball were among pay television's highest-rated offerings, due to heavy viewership in the Southeast.

In November 1988, TBS became the television home of World Championship Wrestling (WCW), which Turner acquired from Jim Crockett Promotions; from 1992 to 2000, it carried the weekly show, WCW Saturday Night, which served as the WCW's flagship program prior to the launch of Monday Nitro on sister channel TNT in 1995. Another WCW show, WCW Thunder, debuted in 1998 on Thursday nights; the program was moved to Wednesdays in 2000, before it was cancelled in 2001 when TBS executive Jamie Kellner determined that wrestling did not fit the demographics of either TBS or TNT and would not be favorable enough to get the "right" advertisers to buy airtime—even though Thunder was the highest-rated show on the channel at the time. In the book NITRO: The Incredible Rise and Inevitable Collapse of Ted Turner's WCW by Guy Evans, it is said that a key condition in WCW's purchase deal with Fusient Media Ventures was that Fusient wanted control over time slots on TNT and TBS networks, regardless of whether these slots would show WCW programming or not. This influenced Kellner's decision to ultimately cancel WCW programming.

On May 19, 2021, WarnerMedia announced that All Elite Wrestling's (AEW) flagship show, AEW Dynamite, would be moving from TNT to TBS in January 2022, marking the first time in over 20 years that TBS would air professional wrestling programming since airing the last episode of WCW Thunder on March 21, 2001. It was later announced that the show would start airing on TBS on January 5, 2022. It was also originally reported that AEW's secondary show, AEW Rampage, would be moving to TBS as well. However, it was later reported that Rampage would stay on TNT.

College basketball

In 2011, TBS obtained the television rights to the NCAA Men's Division I Basketball Championship, with broadcast rights shared with CBS, and fellow Turner properties TNT and TruTV. TBS and the other two Turner-owned networks presently broadcast games played in the second and third rounds of the tournament, with TBS alternating coverage with CBS for the regional semifinals (Sweet Sixteen). In 2014 and 2015, TBS and CBS split coverage of the Regional Finals (Elite Eight), with TBS gaining the two Saturday evening games and CBS retaining the two Sunday afternoon games. Also in 2014 and 2015, TBS covered the national semifinals (Final Four). In 2016, TBS televised the Final Four and the national championship game, beginning an alternating agreement with CBS through 2032. In even-numbered years, TBS now broadcasts the final three games, and in odd-numbered years, CBS televises the games.

College football

In 1981, WTBS acquired the cable television rights to broadcast college football games under a special "supplemental" television contract with the National Collegiate Athletics Association (NCAA) beginning with the 1981 season, limited to games which had already not been distributed for national broadcast by other networks. Beginning with the 1982 season, under a $17.6-million deal reached between the NCAA and Turner on January 27 of that year, consisting of live Division I-AA games on Thursday nights and Division I-A games on Saturdays during the fall. With this, its national superstation feed became the first cable channel to broadcast live college football games nationwide. Beginning in 1984, WTBS's college football coverage shifted to primarily focus on games involving teams in the Southeastern Conference (SEC). WTBS/TBS discontinued its college football contract after the 1992 season.

WTBS/TBS resumed college football coverage in 2002 through a sub-licensing agreement with Fox Sports, which allowed the Atlanta station and superstation feed to carry college football games involving teams in the Big 12 and Pac-10 conferences, to which Fox Sports held the national cable television rights, the network usually aired two games per week during the first four seasons of the contract, reduced to a single weekly game during some weeks in the 2006 season. These rights were transferred exclusively to Fox Sports and its regional sports networks beginning with the 2007 season.

NASCAR

TBS first began carrying NASCAR Winston Cup in 1983, when it acquired the rights to the Winston Western 500 (which was carried annually until 1987). It also broadcast the Richmond 400 spring race (later renamed the Miller High Life 400 and then the Pontiac Excitement 400) from 1983 to 1995, the Atlanta Journal 500 from 1983 to 1985, and the Nationwise 500 (later renamed the AC Delco 500) from 1985 to 1987.

For most of the 1990s, the only Winston Cup Series races aired on TBS were the two races held at Lowe's Motor Speedway (Coca-Cola 600 from 1988 to 2000, UAW-GM Quality 500 from 1989 to 2000) as well as the Miller Genuine Draft 500 (later the Miller 500 and then the Pennsylvania 500) each July from 1993 to 2000. (TBS did not have rights to The Winston, which usually aired on TNN). TBS was also the home of the post-season exhibition races held at Suzuka Circuit and Twin Ring Motegi in Japan from 1996 to 1998. Select Winston Cup, Busch Series and Craftsman Truck Series races aired on TBS until the 2000 season. NASCAR events moved to TNT in 2001 as part of a deal between the organization, NBC and TNT, although the initial plans were for TBS to carry the races. Instead, Turner Broadcasting decided that the NASCAR telecasts would better fit TNT's "We Know Drama" image campaign.

Beach volleyball
As part of a multi-year deal with Turner Sports, the NCAA Beach Volleyball Championship was televised by TBS in 2016 and 2017.

NHL

WTCG carried coverage of the National Hockey League's Atlanta Flames from 1977 to 1980, when the team moved to Calgary.

On April 27, 2021, Turner Sports agreed to a 7-year deal for rights to the National Hockey League. While most regular season games will air on TNT, select playoff games will air on TBS instead.

Esports

On September 23, 2015, Turner Broadcasting announced that plans to launch a Counter-Strike: Global Offensive esports league beginning in 2016. There is also the possibility of other video games being added in future seasons.

Availability

TBS is available on multichannel television providers (including cable, satellite and select over-the-top providers) throughout the entire United States. Until October 1, 2007, the national TBS feed could not be viewed within its home market in the Atlanta metropolitan area, due to the over-the-air presence of WTBS (channel 17), which carried a nearly identical schedule, with the only differing programming being children's programs that meet the FCC's educational programming guidelines and public affairs programming. The operations of WTBS and TBS Superstation were separated in October 2007, with the free-to-air Atlanta station becoming WPCH-TV, a general entertainment independent station focused solely on the Atlanta area. The national TBS feed became available to pay-television subscribers within channel 17's viewing area as a result.

In April 1985, the Canadian Radio-television and Telecommunications Commission (CRTC) granted authorization for the WTBS Atlanta feed and three other American superstations (WGN-TV, WOR-TV and WPIX in New York City) to be distributed to multichannel television providers within Canada. Under CRTC linkage rules first implemented in 1983 that include requirements for providers to offer U.S.-based program services in discretionary tiers tied to Canadian services, TBS and other authorized U.S. superstations typically have been received mainly through a subscription to a domestic premium service—such as First Choice (later The Movie Network and now Crave), Moviepix (later The Movie Network Encore and now Starz), Super Channel, Super Écran, Movie Central (the original user of the Superchannel name, now defunct) and Encore Avenue (also now defunct)—although, beginning in 1997, many cable and satellite providers moved TBS to a basic specialty tier under a related rule that allows for one superstation of the provider's choice to be carried on a non-premium tier. Because the CRTC had only approved the Atlanta station's broadcast signal for distribution to cable, satellite and other domestic subscription television providers, following the separation of TBS and WTBS/WPCH in October 2007, Canadian subscribers continued to receive the re-called WPCH-TV, instead of the national TBS channel. As they are not shown on WPCH, most of TBS's flagship programs—such as Major League Baseball (both regular season and postseason games) and original series (such as Conan)—are carried on other Canadian specialty channels.

References

External links
 

Television networks in the United States
Superstations in the United States
Television channels and stations established in 1976
English-language television stations in the United States
Comedy television networks
Warner Bros. Discovery networks

bg:Turner Broadcasting System
es:TBS Very Funny